La Vila Joiosa is a coastal town and municipality in the Province of Alicante, Valencian Community, Spain, by the Mediterranean Sea. The town is known to the locals simply as La Vila.

It is the historic and administrative capital of the comarca of Marina Baixa and is located 32 km from the city of Alicante, in the coastal area known as Costa Blanca (White Coast). La Vila Joiosa literally means Joyful Town, although the inhabitants often abbreviate it to La Vila. It has over three kilometers of beaches, including La Platja Centre (Central Beach), close to the city centre. The river Amadorio runs through La Vila.

The area is famous for its chocolate industry and tourism. One of the most popular tourist attractions is its Gothic Catholic church of the Assumption, with a Baroque altar piece. Another popular destination, the Royal Palm Casino (formerly Casino Costa Blanca), is now closed. The town's festival of Moros i Cristians, celebrated at the end of July, was declared an International Tourist Interest Festival. Currently, this festivity commemorates a boat landing from the Berber pirates that was repelled by the population of the town.

Notable people
 Maisa Lloret, rhythmic gymnast
 Marta Baldó, rhythmic gymnast and  Olympic Champion (1996, Atlanta)
 José Catalá, footballer
 Felipe Orts, road and cyclo-cross cyclist

Twin towns
 Vitré, Ille-et-Vilaine, France, since 1989
 Quesada, Spain, since 2006
 Bullas, Spain, since 2006

References

External links

Official website

 
Seaside resorts in Spain